George Linus Cobb (August 31, 1886 – December 25, 1942) was an American composer. He composed over 200 pieces of music, including ragtimes, marches, and waltzes. He also wrote columns for music trade publications.

Career
Cobb attended the School of Harmony and Composition at Syracuse University in 1905, and his compositions began soon thereafter.

Cobb collaborated with lyricist Jack Yellen on many early songs, and in 1950 Billboard described Cobb as a "roving music teacher" during Yellen's sophomore year in college. They sold their first big hit, All Aboard for Dixieland, for $100 in 1913, but the two had been writing songs as early as 1909, beginning with Moonlight Makes Me Lonesome For A Girl Like You.

Cobb's most famous work is Russian Rag, a composition based on the opening chord progression of  Rachmaninoff's Prelude in C-sharp minor, Op.3, No.2. The piece was such a hit in 1918 that Cobb wrote The New Russian Rag in 1923 in an attempt to arrange more of the Rachmaninoff prelude for ragtime piano.

By 1917, Cobb began writing a monthly column titled "Just Between You and Me"  in The Tuneful Yankee, a ragtime music magazine owned by publisher Walter Jacobs. The magazine also published many of Cobb's musical compositions. Cobb continued writing for the magazine after the name changed to Melody in 1918.

Selected compositions
Cobb, George L., and Jack Yellen. Alabama Jubilee. New York: Jerome H. Remick & Co, 1915.  
Cobb, George L., and Jack Yellen. All Aboard for Dixieland. New York: Jerome H. Remick & Co, 1914. 
Cobb, George L., and Jack Yellen. Are You from Dixie?: 'cause I'm from Dixie Too. New York: M. Witmark & Sons, 1915. 
Cobb, George L., Jack Yellen, and Will Rossiter. Bring Me Back My Lovin' Honey Boy. Chicago: Will Rossiter, 1913.  
Cobb, George L., and Jack Yellen. Moonlight Makes Me Lonesome For A Girl Like You. 1909.
The New Russian Rag. 1923.
Russian Rag. 1918.
Cobb, George L., and Jack Mahoney. See Dixie First. Boston, Mass: Walter Jacobs, 1916.  
Cobb, George L., and Irving Crocker. Send Me a Line When I'm Across the Ocean, Boston: Walter Jacobs, 1917. 
Cobb, George L., and Robert Levenson. When the Lilies Bloom in France Again.  Boston: Walter Jacobs, 1918.

Death and legacy
Cobb died of coronary thrombosis on December 25, 1942.

See also
List of ragtime composers

References

External links

Audio recording of "Russian Rag" at the Library of Congress jukebox
"Alabama jubilee", New York: Remick Music Corp., 1915, from the Alabama Sheet Music Collection
The Rags of George L. Cobb An overview of Cobb's life and compositions
George Linus Cobb An overview of Cobb's life and compositions

1886 births
1942 deaths
20th-century American composers
American male composers
Ragtime composers
20th-century American male musicians